George Lewis Jones   (c. 1725 – 9 March 1804), was an English Anglican priest, Bishop of Kilmore from 1775 to 1790 when he was translated to Kildare.

Baptised at St Giles, Cripplegate in London on 12 September 1725, he was the son of Theophilus Jones. He was educated at Eton College and matriculated at King's College, Cambridge in 1742. He was ordained in 1747, and held livings in Wiltshire, Surrey and Norfolk. He became chaplain to Simon Harcourt, 1st Earl Harcourt, Lord Lieutenant of Ireland.

He died on 9 March 1804.

References

1725 births
1804 deaths

Year of birth uncertain

Deans of Christ Church Cathedral, Dublin

18th-century Anglican bishops in Ireland
19th-century Anglican bishops in Ireland
Anglican bishops of Kilmore
Anglican bishops of Kildare
Members of the Privy Council of Ireland
People educated at Eton College
Alumni of King's College, Cambridge